"I Promise You (Get Ready)" is a song by English singer Samantha Fox from her eponymous second studio album (1987). It was released in October 1987 as the album's third single. The song was written by Oscar Van Geldern, and produced by Steve Lovell and Steve Power.

The single's B-side, "Suzie, Don't Leave Me with Your Boyfriend", previously appeared on Fox's debut album, Touch Me (1986).

The song became Fox's seventh consecutive single to reach the UK top 60, although it was the lowest-charting of the seven, peaking at number 58 on the UK Singles Chart. In Germany, the song peaked at number 40, becoming her sixth top-40 entry there.

Track listings
7-inch single
A. "I Promise You (Get Ready)" - 3:52
B. "Suzie, Don't Leave Me with Your Boyfriend" - 3:54

12-inch single
A. "I Promise You (Get Ready)" (extended version) - 5:56
B1. "Suzie, Don't Leave Me with Your Boyfriend" - 3:54
B2. "I Promise You (Get Ready)" (instrumental) - 4:16

Charts

References

1987 singles
1987 songs
Jive Records singles
Samantha Fox songs